Rajakumari is a 2009 Indian Kannada language drama film directed by S. Govindraj and produced by K. Manju. The film stars Balaji, Kanika and Nikita Thukral in the leading roles.

The film was a remake of Tamil film Anantha Poongatre (1999).

Cast 
 Balaji as Raja
 Kanika as Kumari
 Nikita Thukral
 Ramnitu Chaudhary
 Srinivasa Murthy as Zamindar
 Avinash
 Rangayana Raghu 
 Sundar Raj
 Bullet Prakash
 Umesh
 V. Ravichandran as Music Teacher (guest appearance)

Soundtrack 
The music is composed by V. Harikrishna. Lyrics were written by V. Nagendra Prasad and K. Kalyan.

Reception 
A critic from The Times of India scored the film at 3 out of 5 stars and says "While Kanniha shines only in a few sequences, Nikhita needs to improve. Rangayana Raghu could have done a better job. Srinivasamurthy is very convincing and Sundararaj excels. V Harikrishna's music and excellent camerawork by M Joshi are the film's highlights". A critic from The New Indian Express wrote "The climax is how Kumari realises her mistake and join hands with Raj. It is worth watching if you have no other alternative to spend your time. The only saving grace of this film are the songs. Music director Harikirshna tried his best to compose tunes which rise above the movie". A critic from Bangalore Mirror wrote  "Post interval, you will learn why Kumari is a widow with a child even though she is a virgin. Poor handling of the already insipid script makes for the perfect disaster that this movie is. At a time when some filmmakers have become fast enough to remake Tamil and Telugu films in Kannada even before the original is released, wonder why Govindu selected a story that has the inertia of old age".

References 

2009 films
2000s Kannada-language films
Indian romantic drama films
Kannada remakes of Tamil films
Films scored by V. Harikrishna
2009 romantic drama films